The Kansas Cagerz was a United States Basketball League team in Salina, Kansas. They were founded in 1998 as the Columbus Cagerz in Columbus, Ohio before moving after their inaugural season. The last head coach was Francis Flax. The Kansas Cagerz won the USBL Championship in 2007 after defeating the Brooklyn Kings 95–92 in Enid, Oklahoma. The USBL's last season was in 2007.

Notable players 
 Billy Thomas
 Devin Brown
 Darrin Hancock
 Jeff Boschee
 Keith Langford
 Michael Christopher Jordan

Logos and uniforms

External links
Kansas Cagerz Official site
USBL League Website

United States Basketball League teams
Basketball teams in Kansas
Sports in Salina, Kansas